The 2013 Chick-fil-A Bowl was a college football bowl game played on December 31, 2013, at the Georgia Dome in Atlanta, Georgia. With sponsorship from Chick-fil-A, it was the 46th edition of the game known throughout most of its history as the Peach Bowl. The game featured the Duke Blue Devils from the Atlantic Coast Conference against the Texas A&M Aggies from the Southeastern Conference.  It began at 8:00 p.m. EST and was aired on ESPN.  It was one of the 2013–14 bowl games that concluded the 2013 FBS football season.

In a contest dominated by both teams' offensive units, Duke scored first and stayed ahead for most of the game.  But with a little more than a minute left in regulation, Texas A&M returned an interception for a touchdown, and ended up winning by a score of 52–48. Although 67,496 tickets were distributed, the crowd was far less than capacity.

Duke finished the regular season with a record of 10–3 (6–2 ACC) and a BCS ranking of #24.  Texas A&M had a record of 8–4 (4–4 SEC) and a BCS ranking of #21.  The 2013 Chick-fil-A Bowl was the first-ever meeting of the two teams.

Teams
The 2013 Chick-fil-A Bowl was the very first meeting between Duke and Texas A&M, as well as both programs' first appearance in the bowl.  Both teams were ranked #21 in the Coaches' Poll coming into the game.

Duke

Texas A&M

Scoring summary

Statistics

Notes
 December 22, 2013 – Texas A&M linebacker Darian Claiborne was suspended after he was arrested on suspicion on drug possession.

References

Chick-fil-A Bowl
Peach Bowl
Duke Blue Devils football bowl games
Texas A&M Aggies football bowl games
Chick-fil-A Bowl
December 2013 sports events in the United States
2013 in Atlanta